This is a list of countries with KFC franchises.

As of 2022, there are at least 25,000 KFC outlets in 147 countries and territories in the world. The first KFC franchise opened in the United States in 1952. The first overseas franchise was established in the United Kingdom in May 1965. A large number of Caribbean and developed Western markets entered by the early 1970s. This was followed by expansion throughout the Middle East and developed Asian markets from the mid-1970s and into the 1980s. China was entered in 1987. Expansions were made into most of Europe and South America in the early 1990s. The most recent area of expansion is Africa, where the company is targeting the continent's growing middle class.

The major markets for KFC include China (7,166 stores), the United States (3,943 stores), Japan (1,140 stores), South Africa (955 stores), the United Kingdom (928 stores), Thailand (853 stores), Malaysia (743 stores), Indonesia (742 stores), Australia (699 stores), and Canada (601 stores).

The global operations are overseen by Yum International, which is headquartered in Louisville, Kentucky. Yum! typically grant a master franchise to a local operator, or take a stake in a joint venture between such a company and itself. In 11 countries, Yum! International manages KFC directly, including China, Russia and India. Worldwide, major franchise holders range from large local conglomerates such as Jardine Matheson and Doosan Group, to companies specifically established to run restaurants franchises, such as AmRest. In Japan, Malaysia and Indonesia, the major franchise holders are publicly listed companies. On the other hand, in smaller markets such as some Caribbean islands, the franchises may be operated by a single individual.

Current markets

Africa

Asia

Caribbean, Central and South America

Europe

North America

Oceania

Former markets

Asia

Caribbean and South America

Europe

Oceania

Footnotes

KFC
KFC